Newcastle Airport  is located in the city of Newcastle, KwaZulu-Natal in South Africa.

References

Transport in KwaZulu-Natal
Airports in South Africa
Newcastle Local Municipality